Diane Allahgreen Hawkins (born 21 February 1975) is a former British Olympic sprint hurdler.
She won a bronze medal in the 60 m hurdles at the 1998 European Indoor Athletics Championships in Valencia and represented Great Britain at the 2000 Summer Olympics and England at the 2002 Commonwealth Games
She retired from competition in 2006. and now works on Merseyside as a Child Protection Social Worker. She is married with two children, Che and Rio.

Achievements 
1994 World Junior Championships in Athletics: 
bronze medal (100 m hurdles)
bronze medal (4 × 100 m relay) with Susie McLoughlin, Sinead Dudgeon, Rebecca Drummond
1998 European Indoor Athletics Championships – bronze medal (60 m hurdles)

References

External links

1975 births
Living people
English female hurdlers
Olympic athletes of Great Britain
Athletes (track and field) at the 2000 Summer Olympics
Alumni of Liverpool Hope University
Athletes (track and field) at the 2002 Commonwealth Games
Commonwealth Games competitors for England
Sportspeople from Liverpool
English female sprinters
Universiade medalists in athletics (track and field)
Universiade bronze medalists for Great Britain
Medalists at the 1999 Summer Universiade